Campo de Jogos do Pragal is the home soccer stadium of Almada Atlético Clube, a Portuguese sports club based in Almada, Portugal.

The stadium is overlooked by and adjacent to the surrounding area of the Cristo Rei monument.

References

Football venues in Portugal
Sport in Almada
Buildings and structures in Setúbal District
Buildings and structures in Almada